Ashley Wallen is an Australian choreographer and has worked with stars such as the Sugababes, Kylie Minogue, Will Young and Mariah Carey.

He was the resident dance captain on The X Factor and appeared as a panelist for Arlene Phillips on BBC One's DanceX. He also choreographed the 2011 UK version of Ghost the Musical.

He was most recently the choreographer for Minogue's Golden Tour, after previously choreographing her Kiss Me Once Tour.  During Minogue's Golden era, Wallen also delivered a dance class for competition winners to learn the dance moves to "Dancing", and dance with Minogue herself.

He also choreographed the 2017 Fox movie The Greatest Showman, starring Hugh Jackman, the 2020 Netflix movie Jingle Jangle: A Christmas Journey, starring Forest Whitaker and the 2021 movie Cinderella for Amazon Prime.

References

External links 
 

Year of birth missing (living people)
Living people
Australian choreographers